A gynandromorph is an organism that contains both male and female characteristics. The term comes from the Greek γυνή (gynē) 'female', ἀνήρ (anēr) 'male', and μορφή (morphē) 'form', and is used mainly in the field of entomology. Gynandromorphism is most frequently recognized in organisms that have strong sexual dimorphism such as certain butterflies, spiders, and birds, but has been recognized in numerous other types of organisms.

Occurrence 
Gynandromorphism has been noted in Lepidoptera (butterflies and moths) since the 1700s. It has also been observed in crustaceans, such as lobsters and crabs, in spiders, ticks, flies, locusts, crickets, dragonflies, ants, termites, bees, lizards, snakes, rodents, and many species of birds. A notable example in birds is the zebra finch. These birds have lateralised brain structures in the face of a common steroid signal, providing strong evidence for a non-hormonal primary sex mechanism regulating brain differentiation.

Pattern of distribution of male and female tissues in a single organism 

A gynandromorph can have bilateral symmetry—one side female and one side male. Alternatively, the distribution of male and female tissue can be more haphazard. Bilateral gynandromorphy arises very early in development, typically when the organism has between 8 and 64 cells. Later stages produce a more random pattern.

Causes 
The cause of this phenomenon is typically (but not always) an event in mitosis during early development. While the organism contains only a few cells, one of the dividing cells does not split its sex chromosomes typically. This leads to one of the two cells having sex chromosomes that cause male development and the other cell having chromosomes that cause female development. For example, an XY cell undergoing mitosis duplicates its chromosomes, becoming XXYY. Usually this cell would divide into two XY cells, but in rare occasions the cell may divide into an X cell and an XYY cell. If this happens early in development, then a large portion of the cells are X and a large portion are XYY. Since X and XYY dictate different sexes, the organism has tissue that is female and tissue that is male.

A developmental network theory of how gynandromorphs develop from a single cell based on a working paper links between parental allelic chromosomes was proposed by Eric Werner in 2012. The major types of gynandromorphs, bilateral, polar and oblique are computationally modeled. Many other possible gynandromorph combinations are computationally modeled, including predicted morphologies yet to be discovered. The article relates gynandromorph developmental control networks to how species may form. The models are based on a computational model of bilateral symmetry.

As a research tool 
Gynandromorphs occasionally afford a powerful tool in genetic, developmental, and behavioral analyses. In Drosophila melanogaster, for instance, they provided evidence that male courtship behavior originates in the brain, that males can distinguish conspecific females from males by the scent or some other characteristic of the posterior, dorsal, integument of females, that the germ cells originate in the posterior-most region of the blastoderm, and that somatic components of the gonads originate in the mesodermal region of the fourth and fifth abdominal segment.

See also
Androgyny
Chimerism
Gynomorph
Half-sider budgerigar
Hermaphrodite
Intersex in humans
Intersex in other species

References

External links

"Stunning Dual-Sex Animals" at Live Science
 Aayushi Pratap: This rare bird is male on one side and female on the other; on: Sciencenews; October 6, 2020; about a gynandromorph rose-breasted grosbeak.

Insect physiology
Sexual dimorphism